"Rosemary's Baby" is the fourth episode of the second season of 30 Rock, and the twenty-fifth episode overall. It was written by Jack Burditt and was directed by Michael Engler. The episode first aired on October 25, 2007 on the NBC network in the United States. Guest stars in this episode include Carrie Fisher, Paul Scheer, and Stuart Zagnit.

The episode focuses on Liz Lemon's (Tina Fey) escapade with her idol, Rosemary Howard (Carrie Fisher); Tracy Jordan's (Tracy Morgan) family problems; and Jenna Maroney's (Jane Krakowski) attempt to replace Kenneth Parcell's (Jack McBrayer) burnt page jacket. The episode was praised by critics, with Alec Baldwin winning the Primetime Emmy Award for Outstanding Lead Actor in a Comedy Series, and Engler, Burditt, and Fisher all receiving Emmy nominations.

Plotlines
Jack Donaghy (Alec Baldwin) announces that Liz Lemon is the winner of the "G.E. Followship Award", a prize awarded to the G.E. employee who best exemplifies a follower, which also includes $10,000. Liz takes Pete Hornberger (Scott Adsit) to a book signing to meet Rosemary Howard (Carrie Fisher), her girlhood idol, and invites her to be a guest writer on The Girlie Show. Rosemary pitches several controversial ideas to Jack, who orders Liz to fire her, but when Liz refuses, Jack fires them both. Liz goes to Rosemary's house, and once she realizes that Rosemary is crazy, she flees. Liz goes back to Jack's office and begs for her job back, and he happily rehires her. Jack promises to help Liz invest her prize money, and she swears that she will send Rosemary $400 a month for the rest of her life.

When Tracy causes a stir at a public event, Jack assures him that as a movie star, he can do anything he wants, except for dog fighting. Jack finds Tracy disobeying his order, but Tracy shouts that Jack is not his dad. Jack and Tracy meet with an NBC shrink, and Jack role-plays Tracy's father, Tracy, and Tracy's mom, among several other people from Tracy's childhood, conveying the message that even though Tracy's parents may have divorced, they still loved him. This comforts Tracy, and affirms that while he loves his family, they are crazy, and he needs to stay away from them. Tracy hugs Jack, and tells him that he is the only family he needs.

Jenna accidentally burns Kenneth's page jacket on a hot plate, and Kenneth worries that head page Donny Lawson (Paul Scheer) will punish him. Jenna finds Donny backstage at the studio, who is ecstatic that he finally has a reason to send Kenneth to CNBC in New Jersey. Donny offers Kenneth a choice: go to New Jersey, or compete in a "page off", a contest of physical stamina and NBC trivia; Jenna agrees to the page off. Before the event starts, Pete comes in and yells at the pages to get back to work. He forces Donny to give Kenneth a new jacket, but Donny swears to Jenna and Kenneth that he will get back at them.

Production
"Rosemary's Baby" was mainly filmed on September 11, 2007, while Fisher's scenes were filmed the next day on September 12, 2007. Star Wars is frequently referenced in 30 Rock, beginning with the pilot episode where Tracy Jordan is seen shouting that he is a Jedi. Liz Lemon admits to being a huge fan of Star Wars, saying that she had watched it many times with Pete Hornberger, and dressed up as the Star Wars character Princess Leia during four recent Halloweens. Star Wars is also referenced when Tracy Jordan takes on the identity of the character Chewbacca. Fey, a fan of Star Wars herself, said that the weekly Star Wars joke or reference "started happening organically" when the crew realized that they had a Star Wars reference "in almost every show". Fey said that from then on "it became a thing where [they] tried to keep it going", and that even though they could not include one in every episode, they still had a "pretty high batting average". Fey attributed most of the references to Robert Carlock, who she described as "the resident expert". Prior to the airing of the episode, fans were "raving" about the much awaited guest appearance of Fisher. Fisher's last line in the episode, "Help me, Liz Lemon! You're my only hope!", was a spoof of the line "Help me Obi-Wan Kenobi, you're my only hope!" from her past role in the original Star Wars trilogy, in which she played Princess Leia.

Reception

According to the Nielsen ratings system, "Rosemary's Baby" was viewed by an average of 6.5 million American viewers. The episode achieved a 3.1/8 in key 18–49 demographic. The 3.1 rating refers to 3.1% of all 18- to 49-year-olds in the U.S., and the 8 share refers to 8% of all 18- to 49-year-olds watching television at the time of the broadcast. In the U.S., "Rosemary's Baby" was up by 19% in the rating demographic compared to the previous episode, "The Collection," receiving its highest result since the second season premiere episode, "SeinfeldVision," on October 4, 2007.

"Rosemary's Baby" was named as one of the "Top 11 TV Episodes of 2007" by UGO, and ranked thirteenth on The Futon Critics list of "the 50 Best Episodes of 2007"; both citing the Baldwin and Morgan therapy scene as the reason. Matt Webb Mitovich of TV Guide declared it as "one of 30 Rock best episodes ever." He praised Carrie Fisher's guest appearance, but felt that Baldwin's role-playing during the therapy session stole the show. Bob Sassone of TV Squad felt that even though the plot was "insane", the episode still managed "to have a heart at its core". Sassone called the therapy scene "one of the funniest scenes ... on TV this season". Robert Canning of IGN felt that the episode has "great storylines to great guest stars", making it "one of the best the series has produced so far". Canning called the therapy scene "the best moment of the episode".  Entertainment Weekly put it on its end-of-the-decade, "best-of" list, saying, " Between Carrie Fisher's delightfully bonkers guest role and Jack Donaghy's hijacking of Tracy Jordan's therapy session, this 2007 episode was so wrong. And so good." In 2016 Emily Nussbaum of The New Yorker described the episode as "the keys-to-all-mythologies of female comedy", which A. O. Scott of The New York Times said "may actually be an understatement. The character of Rosemary Howard certainly embodies the glories and contradictions of second-wave feminism, and Liz's ambivalence about her is a barbed and brilliant illustration of the anxieties of female comic influence". Scott added that given Lemon's depiction as a Star Wars fan, "the casting of Ms. Fisher ... adds about 12 dimensions of meta".

Michael Engler, the director of this episode, was nominated for the Directors Guild of America Award for Outstanding Directing – Comedy Series. This episode also earned Carrie Fisher a Primetime Emmy Award nomination for Outstanding Guest Actress in a Comedy Series and earned Jack Burditt a nomination for Outstanding Writing for a Comedy Series.

References

External links

 

2007 American television episodes
30 Rock (season 2) episodes